Patton Springs Independent School District is a public school district based in the community of Afton, Texas, United States. In addition to Afton, the district serves a portion of Dickens and rural areas in northeastern Dickens County. Patton Springs ISD has one school that serves students in  prekindergarten through grade 12.

Academic achievement
In 2009, the school district was rated "exemplary" by the Texas Education Agency.

Special programs

Athletics
Patton Springs High School plays six-man football.

See also

List of school districts in Texas

References

External links
Patton Springs ISD

School districts in Dickens County, Texas